Annunciation Church is a Roman Catholic Parish church in Chesterfield, Derbyshire. It was founded by the Society of Jesus in 1854. Located in Spencer Street, near Saltergate and off-Newbold Road, it was designed by the architect Joseph Hansom and is a Grade II listed building.

History
In 1840, the Jesuits founded Mount St Mary's College in Spinkhill. From there they missioned to the local Catholics in the area. In the 1850s they decided to build a church in Chesterfield. Joseph Hansom was asked to design the church. He designed numerous churches for the Jesuits, such as Our Lady Immaculate and St Joseph Church, Prescot, the St Walburge's Church, Preston, St Joseph's Church, Leigh, the Holy Name Church, Manchester and St Aloysius Gonzaga Church, Oxford.

The Jesuit influence is visible in the church in the window immediately before the entrance to the Sacristy. It shows a priest saying Mass before a group of Jesuits. Among those depicted are St Ignatius Loyola and St Francis Xavier.

In 1881, the current organ was installed, it was built by Henry Willis Senior of Henry Willis & Sons.

At some point in the early to mid-20th century the administration of the parish was handed over by the Jesuits to the Diocese of Nottingham. In 1980, Chesterfield and other parts of north Derbyshire became part of the then newly created Diocese of Hallam who continue to serve the parish.

In 1990-1991, the church was reordered and the high altar was removed, part of it remains as the pedestal for a statue of the Blessed Virgin Mary.

Parish
The church has four Sunday Masses. They are at 8:30am, 10:00am and 6:00pm and a 1:15pm Mass in Polish. There are weekday Masses at 9:00am at the nearby convent of the Daughters of Divine Charity who run St Joseph's School.

Within the parish are two schools that have a relationship with the church. St Mary's Catholic Primary School is on Cross Street in the buildings where St Mary's Roman Catholic High School, Chesterfield used to be, before it moved to Newbold Street.

See also
 Society of Jesus
 St Mary's Roman Catholic High School, Chesterfield

References

External links
 Annunciation Parish site
 St Mary's Primary School site
 St Mary's High School site

Chesterfield, Annunciation
Roman Catholic churches in Derbyshire
Annunciation Church
Grade II listed Roman Catholic churches in England
Roman Catholic churches completed in 1874
1874 establishments in England
Gothic Revival architecture in Derbyshire
Gothic Revival church buildings in England
Buildings by Joseph Hansom
19th-century Roman Catholic church buildings in the United Kingdom
Roman Catholic Diocese of Hallam